(born May 23, 1949) is a professional Go player. He is also the co-author of the go strategy book Attack and Defense.

Biography 
Ishida was a student of Fukuda Masayoshi when he became an insei. 8 years after becoming an insei, Ishida became a pro in 1966. He was promoted quickly, reaching 9 dan in 1982. In 1972, he won the Oteai's top section, and later went on to win two straight Shinjin-O titles in 1978 and 1979. Two years later, he won another title, the Shin-Ei. He won the "Best Technique Award" from Kido on three occasions. He currently resides in Tokyo, Japan.

Promotion record

Titles

References

1949 births
Japanese Go players
Go (game) writers
Living people